Norman Cross was a rural district in Huntingdonshire from 1894 to 1974.

It was formed in 1894 under the Local Government Act 1894 from the part of the Peterborough rural sanitary district which was in Huntingdonshire (the rest forming part of Peterborough Rural District).  It was named for the historic Norman Cross hundred.

It was expanded in 1935 by taking in Elton from the disbanded Oundle Rural District, and Sibson cum Stibbington, which had previously been administered in Barnack Rural District based over the border in the Soke of Peterborough.

In 1965 the Soke and Huntingdonshire merged to form Huntingdon and Peterborough.

In 1974 the district was abolished under the Local Government Act 1972.  Most of the district went on to form part of the Huntingdonshire district in the non-metropolitan county of Cambridgeshire, except that some areas in the north which were part of Peterborough New Town became part of Peterborough.

Parishes

References

History of Peterborough
Politics of Peterborough
Districts of England abolished by the Local Government Act 1972
Districts of England created by the Local Government Act 1894
Rural districts of England